Valeri (or Valery) Viktorovich Broshin (Russian: Валерий Викторович Брошин; 19 October 1962, Leningrad – 5 March 2009, Moscow) was a Russian-Turkmen professional footballer and football manager.

Career
During his playing career, he appeared with clubs such as FC Zenit Saint Petersburg and PFC CSKA Moscow. He earned 3 caps for the USSR national football team, and participated in the 1990 FIFA World Cup finals. He later received Turkmenistani citizenship in order to be eligible to play on the Turkmenistan national football team (1997–98).

He was the manager of FC Nika Moscow in 2005–06 season.

In 2009, Broshin died of cancer at the age of 46.

References

External links
 
 Profile
 

1962 births
2009 deaths
Footballers from Saint Petersburg
Association football midfielders
Soviet footballers
Russian footballers
Turkmenistan footballers
Soviet Union international footballers
Turkmenistan international footballers
Russian emigrants to Turkmenistan
Dual internationalists (football)
1990 FIFA World Cup players
Russian expatriate footballers
Expatriate footballers in Finland
Expatriate footballers in Spain
Expatriate footballers in Israel
Expatriate footballers in Turkmenistan
Expatriate footballers in Belarus
Russian expatriate sportspeople in Israel
Turkmenistan expatriate sportspeople in Belarus
Soviet Top League players
Russian Premier League players
Veikkausliiga players
Belarusian Premier League players
Liga Leumit players
FC Zenit Saint Petersburg players
PFC CSKA Moscow players
Kuopion Palloseura players
CD Badajoz players
Hapoel Kfar Saba F.C. players
Maccabi Petah Tikva F.C. players
FK Köpetdag Aşgabat players
FC SKA Rostov-on-Don players
FC Gomel players
Russian football managers
Deaths from cancer in Russia